Irma Rut Erixson Hjort (born 8 July 1937) is a Swedish actress. She is daughter to Sven and Ingeborg Erixson, and sister to the artist Sverre Erixson (born 1932).

Erixson educated at Calle Flygare's drama school 1954–56 and debuted with Arne Källerud at his theatre Nöjeskatten in Stockholm.

In 2009 Erixson appeared in the play Blodsbröllop at Halland Theatre.

Selected filmography 

 1957 - Värmlänningarna
 1963 - Adam och Eva
 1963 - Sten Stensson Returns 
 1981 - Tuppen
 1982 - Polisen som vägrade svara (TV)
 1988 - Polisen som vägrade ta semester (TV)
 1998 - Rena rama Rolf (TV)
 2001 - Kommissarie Winter (TV)
 2003 - Solbacken: Avd. E (TV)
 2003 - Lejontämjaren
 2004 - The Return of the Dancing Master
 2015 - Jönssonligan – Den perfekta stöten

References

External links 

 
 Swedish Film Database

1937 births
Living people
Swedish film actresses
Swedish television actresses